Sex hormones, also known as sex steroids,  gonadocorticoids and gonadal steroids, are steroid hormones that interact with vertebrate steroid hormone receptors. The sex hormones include the androgens, estrogens, and progestogens. Their effects are mediated by slow genomic mechanisms through nuclear receptors as well as by fast nongenomic mechanisms through membrane-associated receptors and signaling cascades. The polypeptide hormones luteinizing hormone, follicle-stimulating hormone and gonadotropin-releasing hormone – each associated with the gonadotropin axis – are usually not regarded as sex hormones, although they play major sex-related roles.

Production
Natural sex hormones are made by the gonads (ovaries or testes), by adrenal glands, or by conversion from other sex steroids in other tissue such as liver or fat.

Types
In many contexts, the two main classes of sex hormones are androgens and estrogens, of which the most important human derivatives are testosterone and estradiol, respectively. Other contexts will include progestogens as a third class of sex steroids, distinct from androgens and estrogens. Progesterone is the most important and only naturally occurring human progestogen. In general, androgens are considered "male sex hormones", since they have masculinizing effects, while estrogens and progestogens are considered "female sex hormones" although all types are present in each sex at different levels.

Sex hormones include:
 Progestogens
 Pregnenolone → Progesterone → Allopregnanedione → Allopregnanolone
 17α-Hydroxypregnenolone → 17α-Hydroxyprogesterone
 Androgens
 Dehydroepiandrosterone → Androstenedione → Androstanedione → Androsterone
 Androstenediol → Testosterone → Dihydrotestosterone → Androstanediol
 Estrogens
 2-Hydroxyestrone ← Estrone → 16α-Hydroxyestrone
 2-Hydroxyestradiol ← Estradiol → Estriol → Estetrol

Synthetic sex steroids
There are also many synthetic sex steroids. Synthetic androgens are often referred to as anabolic steroids. Synthetic estrogens and progestins are used in methods of hormonal contraception. Ethinylestradiol is a semi-synthetic estrogen. Specific compounds that have partial agonist activity for steroid receptors, and therefore act in part like natural steroid hormones, are in use in medical conditions that require treatment with steroid in one cell type, but where systemic effects of the particular steroid in the entire organism are only desirable within certain limits.

See also
 List of investigational sex-hormonal agents
 Effects of hormones on sexual motivation
 Sex hormone therapy

References

External links
 

Animal reproductive system
Human sexuality
Animal sexuality
Hormones of the hypothalamus-pituitary-gonad axis
Intersex and medicine